Hemicycla plicaria is a species of gastropod in the family Helicidae. It is endemic to Spain.

References

Endemic fauna of the Canary Islands
Molluscs of the Canary Islands
Hemicycla
Endemic fauna of Spain
Gastropods described in 1816
Taxonomy articles created by Polbot